Centerville is a city in Montgomery County, Ohio, United States. A core suburb of Metro Dayton, its population was 24,240 as of the 2020 census.

Geography
Centerville is located at  (39.638709, -84.148087).  Although the city is located primarily in Montgomery County, a small portion is located in Greene County.

Centerville and Washington Township voted November 4, 2008 on whether to create a merger commission. The proposed merger commission succeeded in the city but failed in the township.

Demographics

2010 census
As of the census of 2010, there were 23,999 people, 10,693 households, and 6,694 families living in the city. The racial makeup of the city was 90.2% White, 4.0% African American, 0.2% Native American, 3.2% Asian, 0.4% from other races, and 1.9% from two or more races. Hispanic or Latino of any race were 1.8% of the population.

There were 10,693 households, of which 25.0% had children under the age of 18 living with them, 50.3% were married couples living together, 9.4% had a female householder with no husband present, 2.9% had a male householder with no wife present, and 37.4% were non-families. 32.6% of all households were made up of individuals, and 16.4% had someone living alone who was 65 years of age or older. The average household size was 2.19 and the average family size was 2.78.

The median age in the city was 46.9 years. 20.1% of residents were under the age of 18; 6.4% were between the ages of 18 and 24; 20.8% were from 25 to 44; 28.4% were from 45 to 64; and 24.4% were 65 years of age or older. The gender makeup of the city was 46.2% male and 53.8% female.

2000 census
As of the census of 2000, there were 23,024 people, 9,996 households, and 6,597 families living in the city. The population density was 2,257.2 people per square mile (871.5/km2). There were 10,422 housing units at an average density of 1,021.7 per square mile (394.5/km2). The racial makeup of the city was 92.33% White, 2.94% African American, 0.13% Native American, 3.17% Asian, 0.06% Pacific Islander, 0.26% from other races, and 1.10% from two or more races. Hispanic or Latino of any race were 1.18% of the population.

There were 9,996 households, out of which 26.5% had children under the age of 18 living with them, 56.0% were married couples living together, 7.9% had a female householder with no husband present, and 34.0% were non-families. 30.0% of all households were made up of individuals, and 11.8% had someone living alone who was 65 years of age or older. The average household size was 2.26 and the average family size was 2.82.

In the city the population was spread out, with 21.6% under the age of 18, 6.2% from 18 to 24, 25.8% from 25 to 44, 27.5% from 45 to 64, and 18.9% who were 65 years of age or older. The median age was 43 years. For every 100 females, there were 86.7 males. For every 100 females age 18 and over, there were 83.3 males.

The median income for a household in the city was $54,892, and the median income for a family was $68,580. Males had a median income of $52,331 versus $34,881 for females. The per capita income for the city was $30,210. About 3.4% of families and 4.1% of the population were below the poverty line, including 6.4% of those under age 18 and 3.6% of those age 65 or over.

Arts and culture

Stone buildings
Centerville has the largest collection of early stone houses in the state of Ohio. Many are listed in the National Register of Historic Places.

Town Hall Theatre
The Town Hall Theatre is located in the "Heart of Centerville" and has been serving the community for over 70 years.

Heart of Centerville
The Heart of Centerville features a selection of boutiques, restaurants and businesses in a historic setting which includes Ohio's largest collection of early stone buildings.

Education

Public schools

Centerville Public Schools are part of the Centerville City School District. The district has a preschool which is located in each of the two elementary schools teaching kindergarten to first grade. The district also has six elementary schools teaching second through fifth grade, three middle schools teaching sixth through eight grade, as well as one high school and an alternative high school.

The other public schools in this district include:

 Centerville Primary Village North
 Centerville Primary Village South (2007)
 Normandy Elementary School (1963)
 Stingley Elementary School
 Driscoll Elementary School
 Weller Elementary 
 W.O. Cline Elementary School (1955)
 John Hole Elementary School 
 C.W. Magsig Middle School (1924)
 Hadley E. Watts Middle School (1969)
 Centerville School of Possibilities
 Centerville High School (1973)

Private schools
There is also one Catholic K-8 School and a Seventh-day Adventist Pre-12 Preparatory School serving the city.  Several of the public and private schools have achieved blue ribbon status.

Public library
Nationally ranked Washington-Centerville Public Library offers residents access to more than 380,000 books, audios, movies, and music as well as educational programs, community services, and research assistance for youth and adults.

Notable people
Hannah Beachler, academy award winner for production design
Michael Bennett, NFL defensive tackle for the Jacksonville Jaguars
Erma Bombeck, essayist
Stevie Brock, singer
Phil Donahue, talk show host
Nancy Dutiel, fashion and beauty model (Lancôme)
Bill Elmore, co-founder of Foundation Capital
Claire Falknor, professional soccer player for the Houston Dash
Eric Fanning, was appointed 22nd Secretary of the Army by President Obama on May 18, 2016
Andy Harmon, former Philadelphia Eagles player
A. J. Hawk, former NFL linebacker for the Green Bay Packers, Atlanta Falcons, and Cincinnati Bengals 
Kirk Herbstreit, played quarterback at Ohio State before becoming a sports analyst on the ESPN program College Gameday
Will Johnson, NFL fullback
Ben Judd, video game agent and producer
Pat Kilbane, comic actor, singer
Holley Mangold, Olympic weightlifter and female football player
Nick Mangold, former offensive lineman for the New York Jets
Sean Murphy (baseball), catcher for the Oakland Athletics
Mike Nugent, played football for Ohio State University, and the New York Jets and Cincinnati Bengals of the National Football League
Ifeadi Odenigbo, Current defensive end for the Cleveland Browns
Chip Reese, poker player
Joe Thuney, Current offensive guard for the Kansas City Chiefs
Mike Tolbert, American football player
Nate Leaman, American ice hockey coach

Sister cities
Centerville has two sister cities, as designated by Sister Cities International: 
  Waterloo, Ontario, Canada
  Bad Zwischenahn, Lower Saxony, Germany

See also
 Mad River Road
 State Route 48
 State Route 725

References

External links
 The Centerville-Washington Township Historical Society, Retrieved July 15, 2016
 City of Centerville
 Heart of Centerville

Cities in Ohio
Cities in Greene County, Ohio
Cities in Montgomery County, Ohio
Populated places established in 1796
1796 establishments in the Northwest Territory
Dayton metropolitan area